Kim Joo-hyuk (3 October 1972 – 30 October 2017) was a South Korean actor. He was known for his leading roles in the films My Wife Got Married (2008), The Servant (2010), and Yourself and Yours (2016), his supporting roles in Confidential Assignment (2017) and Believer (2018), as well as the television series Lovers in Prague (2005), God of War (2012), Hur Jun, The Original Story (2013) and Argon (2017). He was also an original regular cast member on the third season of the KBS2's reality-variety show 2 Days & 1 Night.

Personal life

Family
Kim was the son of actor Kim Mu-saeng. He and his father both played real-life court physician Heo Jun.

Relationships
Kim began dating actress Kim Ji-soo in 2003; they portrayed a married couple in the 2002 TV series Like a Flowing River. Their six-year relationship ended in 2009. Kim also dated God of War co-star Kim Gyu-ri from 2012 to 2013. In December 2016, Kim was confirmed to be in a relationship with Yourself and Yours (2016) co-star Lee Yoo-young.

Death
On 30 October 2017, Kim was involved in a fatal car crash that occurred around 4:30 p.m. KST in Samseong-dong, Gangnam-gu, Seoul. His car overturned and he was taken to Konkuk University Hospital where he was pronounced dead two hours after arrival. According to the police and Konkuk University Medical Center, "It seems the accident occurred after he showed symptoms of a myocardial infarction". However, it was later stated by the police that the autopsy showed no signs of him having a heart attack and that the cause of death was a cranial fracture. Moreover, no traces of alcohol or other toxins were detected in the body and the police investigation revealed no evidence of vehicle defects that could have caused the crash.

Filmography

Film

Television series

Variety show

Music video

Discography

Awards and nominations

References

External links
  at Namoo Actors 
 
 
 

1972 births
2017 deaths
South Korean male film actors
South Korean male television actors
Dongguk University alumni
21st-century South Korean male actors
Road incident deaths in South Korea
Best Supporting Actor Paeksang Arts Award (film) winners
Gim clan of Gyeongju